Höfn Glacier Museum was a museum in Höfn in eastern Iceland. It had a variety of displays on the geology, ecology and history of the nearby Vatnajökull glacier and various enactments of explorer tents and models and climbing ropes from the Jöklafari Expedition of 1950. It closed in 2013.

References

External links

 Website

Geology museums in Iceland
Natural history museums in Iceland